Üllés is a village in Csongrád county, in the Southern Great Plain region of southern Hungary. There is a gas field near the village.

Geography

Populated places in Csongrád-Csanád County